The 2022–23 Kansas Jayhawks men's basketball team represented the University of Kansas in the 2022–23 NCAA Division I men's basketball season, which was the Jayhawks' 125th basketball season. The Jayhawks, members of the Big 12 Conference, played their home games at Allen Fieldhouse in Lawrence, Kansas. They were led by 20th year Hall of Fame head coach Bill Self.

On November 2, 2022, Kansas announced that Self and assistant coach Kurtis Townsend would serve a four-game suspension for alleged recruiting violations from a 2017 FBI probe. Assistant coach Norm Roberts served as acting head coach during the suspension. Roberts would serve as acting head again during the Big 12 Tournament while Self was hospitalized for an undisclosed illness.

In January, the Jayhawks lost to Kansas State, TCU, and Baylor for what is only their 4th 3 game losing streak under Self, and only the 11th losing streak of any length. After defeating Texas Tech on February 28, the Jayhawks clinched the Big 12 title, their 21st regular season Big 12 title and their 64th regular season conference title.

The Jayhawks qualified for the NCAA tournament with an at-large bid. It was the Jayhawks NCAA record extending 33rd consecutive and their 51st in program history, but were eliminated in the 2nd round.

Offseason

Players graduated
Below are players who ran out of eligibility or seniors that did not declare intent for a 5th year as allowed by the NCAA due to the COVID-19 pandemic.

Entered NBA draft
Players listed below are underclassmen who have entered the 2022 NBA draft. Class provided is class from previous season.

Incoming transfers

Walk-ons

2022 recruiting class

|-
| colspan="7" style="padding-left:10px;" | Overall recruiting rankings:     247 Sports: 4     Rivals: 3       ESPN: 5''' 
|}

Roster

Schedule and results

|-
!colspan=12 style=| Exhibition

|-
!colspan=12 style=| Regular Season

|-
!colspan=12 style=| Big 12 Tournament

|-
!colspan=12 style=| NCAA Tournament

Rankings

References

Kansas Jayhawks men's basketball seasons
Kansas
Kansas Jayhawks men's basketball
Kansas Jayhawks men's basketball
Kansas